"She Makes My Nose Bleed" is a song by the English alternative rock band Mansun. The song was written by band-leader Paul Draper. It was recorded and produced by Draper with additional production by Mark 'Spike' Stent during sessions for the group's début studio album. The song was one of four demoed by the group in 1995 that helped the group secure a publishing contract with Polygram Music Publishing. The song was released as the fourth single (their fifth on a major-label, also known as Five EP) in early 1997 from the group's debut album, Attack of the Grey Lantern. The single was a big commercial success for the group breaking them into the UK Top Ten for the first time with a peak of #9.

The music video for "She Makes My Nose Bleed" was directed by John Hillcoat.

Meaning
The song's title was interpreted by the media as a reference to Cocaine, Mark Sutherland for example reviewing the song for the NME described the lyrics as 'Coke-crazy'. Draper refuted the interpretation in the liner-notes to Legacy: The Best of Mansun. Draper described the writing process and the song's meaning: 'This one started as She Makes Me Bleed but that sounded too earnest. So I added the 'nose' bit assuming everybody would think I was really witty. Instead everybody just thought I was a big druggy!'

Track listing

Personnel

Mansun
Dominic Chad – lead guitar, piano, backing vocals, synthesizer
Stove – bass
Andie Rathbone – drums
Paul Draper – vocals, guitars, piano, synthesizer, production

Production
Paul Draper – producer
Mike Hunter – engineer (all tracks except "She Makes My Nose Bleed (Acoustic)"), additional overdubs ("The Most to Gain")
Ronnie Stone – engineer ("She Makes My Nose Bleed", "Flourella", "The Holy Blood and the Holy Grail")
Mark 'Spike' Stent – additional production ("She Makes My Nose Bleed"), mixing ("She Makes My Nose Bleed", "The Most to Gain", "The Holy Blood and the Holy Grail"), additional overdubs ("The Most to Gain")
Ian Caple – recording ("The Most to Gain"), engineer ("Flourella")
Clif Norrell - mixing ("Flourella")
Nick Griffiths - recording, engineer ("She Makes My Nose Bleed (Acoustic)")
Barnaby and Scott - photography
Neil Mersh - band photography (CD two)
Pennie Smith - band photography (7")
Stylorouge London - artwork

Chart positions

References

1997 singles
Mansun songs
Songs written by Paul Draper (musician)
1997 songs
Song recordings produced by Spike Stent
Parlophone singles